Eliz Sanasarian is an Iranian-American professor of political science at the University of Southern California. She is best known for her expertise and books on ethnic politics and feminism, particularly regarding the Middle East and Iran. Sanasarian joined the faculty in 1985.

Bibliography
 1982 - Women's rights movement in Iran : mutiny, appeasement, and repression from 1900 to Khomeini, .
 1992 - Women and development in the Middle East and North Africa / edited by Joseph G. Jabbra and Nancy W. Jabbra, .
 2000 - Religious minorities in Iran, Cambridge University Press, .
 2007 - Global Feminism: Transnational Women's Activism, Organizing, and Human Rights. Perspectives On Politics. pp. 842–843.
 2007 - The Fire, the Star and the Cross: Minority Religions in Medieval and Early Modern Iran.

Honors and awards
Best Research Book on Women, Sedigheh Dovlatabadi Library, Tehran, 2006–2007
USC or School/Dept Award for Teaching, Political Science Award for Outstanding Classroom Teaching and Dedication to Students, 1997–1998
USC Raubenheimer Outstanding Junior Faculty Award, President's Circle Faculty Award for Outstanding Merit in Teaching, Research, and Service, 1987

References

External links 
Eliz Sanasarian - Professor of Political Science, University of Southern California

American women political scientists
American political scientists
Iranian political scientists
University of Southern California faculty
Iranian women academics
American women scientists
Iranian women scientists
Iranian expatriate academics
Iranian feminists
American feminists
Iranian expatriates in the United States
American people of Armenian descent
Iranian people of Armenian descent
Year of birth missing (living people)
Place of birth missing (living people)
Living people
American women academics
21st-century American women